The Romanian Constitution (Article 62), under the conditions imposed by the Electoral Law, provides seats in the Chamber of Deputies for the party and cultural association of ethnic minorities in Romania (with the limitation that each national minority is to be represented by one organization only). Minority parties and associations are exempt from the electoral threshold, and are guaranteed a seat so long as they earn at least 10% of the vote that was required for the last party eligible to earn a seat through the threshold.

The minority parties and associations are aligned within the National Minority Parliamentary Group in the Chamber of Deputies, and traditionally, these groups support the government in power. The number of seats awarded to ethnic minorities varied from 10 in 1990 to 18 between 2000 and 2016, and once more since 2020 onwards.

List of parties 

The following parties have held seats in the Chamber of Deputies. In addition to the below, the ethnically-based Democratic Alliance of Hungarians in Romania (RMDSZ) has been playing a significant role in the country's local and central politics, competing in elections under the essentially same manner as non-ethnic parties.

Lastly, a number of political parties represented Romania's ethnic minorities—particularly Hungarians, Germans, and Jews—until 1938 and, in the case of the Hungarian People's Union (MNSZ/UPM or MADOSZ), until 1953.

Active 

 Association of Italians of Romania
 Association of Macedonians of Romania
 Bulgarian Union of Banat–Romania
 Community of the Lipovan Russians in Romania
 Cultural Union of Ruthenians of Romania
 Democratic Forum of Germans in Romania
 Democratic Turkish Union of Romania
 Democratic Union of Slovaks and Czechs of Romania
 Democratic Union of Turkish-Muslim Tatars of Romania
 Federation of the Jewish Communities in Romania
 Hellenic Union of Romania
 League of Albanians of Romania
 Party of the Roma
 Union of Armenians of Romania
 Union of Croatians of Romania
 Union of Poles of Romania
 Union of Serbs of Romania
 Union of the Ukrainians of Romania

Defunct 

 Bratstvo Community of Bulgarians in Romania (defunct)
 Cultural Union of Albanians of Romania (defunct)

References 

Political parties